The Pankou Dam is a concrete-face rock-fill dam on the Du River about  southwest of Shiyan in Zhushan County of Hubei Province, China. The purpose of the dam is hydroelectric power production and flood control. It supports a 513 MW power station located at its base. Construction on the dam began in May 2008 and its generators were commissioned in 2012.

See also 

 Huanglongtan Dam – located downstream
 List of dams and reservoirs in China
 List of tallest dams in China

References

Dams in China
Concrete-face rock-fill dams
Dams completed in 2012
Energy infrastructure completed in 2012
Hydroelectric power stations in Hubei